Apostolepis nigrolineata, the Pará blackhead, is a species of snake in the family Colubridae. It is found in Brazil.

References 

nigrolineata
Reptiles described in 1869
Reptiles of Brazil]
Taxa named by Wilhelm Peters